
Gmina Gdów is a rural gmina (administrative district) in Wieliczka County, Lesser Poland Voivodeship, in southern Poland.

Neighbouring gminas
Gmina Gdów is bordered by the gminas of Bochnia, Dobczyce, Łapanów, Niepołomice, Raciechowice and Wieliczka.

Villages
The gmina contains the following villages having the status of sołectwo: Bilczyce, Cichawa, Czyżów, Fałkowice, Gdów, Hucisko, Jaroszówka, Klęczana, Krakuszowice, Książnice, Kunice, Liplas, Marszowice, Niegowić, Niewiarów, Nieznanowice, Niżowa, Pierzchów, Podolany, Stryszowa, Świątniki Dolne, Szczytniki, Wiatowice, Wieniec, Winiary, Zagórzany, Zalesiany, Zborczyce and Zręczyce.

References
 Polish official population figures 2006

Gdow
Wieliczka County